Henk Bloemers (17 September 1945 – 26 January 2015) was a Dutch footballer who played as a central defender.

Club career
A central defender, Bloemers spent his entire career with FC Eindhoven, amassing a record total of 641 official games in which he scored 58 goals. Hence, he was regarded as Mister Eindhoven by the club and supporters. In 20 years with the club, he only had two seasons in the Eredivisie. He played his final game in a 1-7 loss at FC Twente in 1984, a game he had to leave early due to injury.

Death and legacy
A stand in Eindhoven's Jan Louwers Stadion was named after him in 2006 and he was named honorary member of the club in 2012. He died in January 2015, aged 69.

References

External links
 Obituary - Mensenlinq 

1945 births
2015 deaths
Footballers from Eindhoven
Association football central defenders
Dutch footballers
FC Eindhoven players
Eredivisie players
Eerste Divisie players